Graphium gudenusi is a butterfly in the family Papilionidae. It is found in the Democratic Republic of the Congo, Rwanda, Burundi and Uganda. Its habitat consists of forests.
It is a generally scarce species. Males fly along the banks of forest streams and
rivers, occasionally mudpuddling.

Taxonomy
Graphium  gudenusi is a member of the  antheus - clade Graphium antheus, Graphium colonna, Graphium evombar , Graphium kirbyi, Graphium junodi, Graphium polistratus,  Graphium illyris, Graphium gudenusi).

See also
Bwindi Impenetrable National Park Habitat in Uganda

References

Carcasson, R.H 1960 The Swallowtail Butterflies of East Africa (Lepidoptera, Papilionidae). Journal of the  East Africa Natural History Society pdf Key to East Africa members of the species group, diagnostic and other notes and figures. (Permission to host granted by The East Africa Natural History Society
Jackson,T. H. E. 1956  Notes on the Rhopalocera of the Kigezi District of Uganda with descriptions of new species and subspecies Journal of The East Africa Natural History Society Volume XXIII  Figure Plate 1

External links
External images

gudenusi
Butterflies of Africa
Lepidoptera of Uganda
Butterflies described in 1911